Fathabad (also Romanized as Fatḩābād and FatḨābād; also known as Khanjarī-ye Bālā) is a village in Sahra Rural District, Anabad District, Bardaskan County, Razavi Khorasan Province, Iran. At the 2006 census, its population was 24, in 11 families.

References 

Populated places in Bardaskan County